Praetorians is the fifth full length studio album, and eighth album overall, released by the black metal band Naer Mataron. It was released on the Season of Mist label in 2008, the first album by Naer Mataron on this label.

Track listing
Anti-Celestial Campaign – 1:09
Ostara – 5:52
Sun Wheel – 7:50
Death Cast a Shadow over You – 5:46
Secret Heritage – 7:20
Astral Anthology – 0:43
Sol Invictus – 4:59
Incarcerating Gallantry – 4:44
The Eternal Pest – 6:51
Eagle's Nest – 4:44
Praetorians – 9:18

External links
Official homepage
Metal Archives
Discogs page

2008 albums
Naer Mataron albums
Season of Mist albums